KTFA-LP, UHF analog channel 48, was a low-powered HSN-affiliated television station licensed to Albuquerque, New Mexico, United States. The station was owned by Entravision Communications.

History
Channel 48 had simulcasted programming from Univision affiliate KLUZ-TV for many years. In January 2002, it became an affiliate of a new Spanish-language network called Telefutura. By June 2003, Telefutura moved to then-Pax TV affiliate KTFQ-TV (channel 14). KTFA became an HSN affiliate later that year.

Entravision surrendered the license for KTFA-LP to the Federal Communications Commission on January 12, 2018, and it was cancelled on January 17.

Digital television
KTFA was granted a construction permit to flash cut to digital broadcasting on April 19, 2012. It was to expire on September 1, 2015, which was the deadline for low-powered television stations to switch to digital operations. It would have broadcast from its transmitter site atop Sandia Crest at the class maximum power of 15 kW.

External links
 Official website

TFA-LP
Mass media in Albuquerque, New Mexico
Television channels and stations established in 1981
1981 establishments in New Mexico
Defunct television stations in the United States
Television channels and stations disestablished in 2018
2018 disestablishments in New Mexico